The most popular sports in Jamaica are mostly imported from Britain. The most popular sports are athletics, cricket and association football; other popular sports include basketball and netball (usually for women).

Out of all the top five sports, Mixed martial arts, rugby league and rugby union are also considered growing sports in Jamaica.

Athletics

Jamaica is one of the leading countries in sprinting with the current world record holder for 100m and 200m, Usain Bolt and the former 100m world record holder, Asafa Powell, both originating from the island, as does Yohan Blake, silver medalist at the 2012 London Olympics in the 100m and 200m. Also, a team of four Jamaicans, Bolt included (Powell being absent in Daegu 2011 due to injury), won the gold and broke the World Record in the 2008 Beijing Olympics and the 2011 IAAF World Athletics Championships, their new personal best is 37.04, from 37.10 in 2008. They broke the record for a third time at the 2012 London Olympics in a time of 36.84, is the only country to run sub-37 seconds. In addition, the country has a very strong high school athletics program throughout the schools which sees top high schools compete each year in the Inter-Secondary Schools Boys' and Girls' Championships. The 2010 winners of the event were Wolmer's Boys' School and Holmwood Technical High School (girls).  The ability of Jamaicans to dominate the sprint is only further enhanced and highlighted by the supremacy of Usain Bolt, who earned his Olympic 'Triple-Double' (retaining his 100m and 200m titles from the 2008 Beijing Olympics at the 2012 London Olympics and 2016 Rio de Janeiro Olympics).

Cricket

Cricket is one of the most popular sports in Jamaica. The Jamaica national cricket team has won ten Regional Four Day Competitions and seven WICB Cups. Jamaicans also play for the West Indies cricket team, which won the 1975 and 1979 Cricket World Cup, as well as the T20 International Cricket Council World Cup in 2012 and 2016. Jamaica has produced some of the world's most famous cricketers, including George Headley, Courtney Walsh, Chris Gayle and Michael Holding.

Netball

Netball is a popular sport among Jamaican women, and is the country's most popular women's sport. The Jamaica national netball team, known as the Sunshine Girls, have participated in the Netball World Championships every year since their inception in 1963, finishing third in 1991, 2003 and 2007, and in the Commonwealth Games, earning the bronze medal in 2002, 2014 and 2018, followed by a silver in 2022.

Association football

Association football is a very popular sport in Jamaica, and is played at the professional and amateur levels, as well as informally on the street. The Jamaica national football team has won the Caribbean Cup five times, in 1991, 1998, 2005, 2008 and 2010. In addition, Jamaica advanced to the 1998 FIFA World Cup, where they earned a 2–1 win against Japan, although failing to advance past the first round. The Jamaica National Premier League is the first division football league in the country. The top two teams from Jamaica qualify for the CFU Club Championship. A top three finish in the CFU Club Championship grants a spot in the CONCACAF Champions League.

Basketball

The island's fastest growing sport has produced several world-class athletes, most notably Basketball Hall of Fame player Patrick Ewing.

Lacrosse
For the first time, Jamaica will feature a national team at the 2022 Under-19 World Lacrosse Championships.

Mixed martial arts

This sport has become very popular in Jamaica, due to the participation of fighters as Uriah Hall, Aljamain Sterling, Randy Brown & Leon Edwards in the UFC.

Rugby league

Rugby league has been played in Jamaica since 2006.
The Jamaica national rugby league team is made up of players who play in Jamaica and from UK based professional and semi professional clubs (notably in the Super League and Championship). In November 2018 for the first time ever, the Jamaica rugby league team qualified for the Rugby League World Cup after defeating the USA (16-10) & Canada (38-8). Jamaica will play in the 2021 Rugby League World Cup in England.

Rugby union

Rugby union in Jamaica is a minor but growing sport, with 2,090 registered players. The sport is governed by the Jamaica Rugby Union. The Jamaica national rugby union team is ranked 84th in the world by the IRB rankings.

Stadiums in Jamaica

See also 
 Jamaica at the Olympics
 Jamaica at the Pan American Games
 Jamaica at the Commonwealth Games
 Jamaica bobsleigh team

References